Azerbaijani traditional clothing is the traditional attire of the Azerbaijani people. It is closely connected to its history, religious culture and national identity. 

Costumes and dresses are of great importance in Azerbaijani culture. Azerbaijani style is visible in ornaments of costumes with artistic embroideries in weaving and knitting. In the 17th century, the territory of modern Azerbaijan was of great importance to the silk industry. Silks were produced in the cities Shamakhi, Basqal, Ganja, Shaki, Shusha, and others.

The style of clothes and their colours reflects their wearers' marital status, wealth, and other information.

Men's wear
Male folkwear is very similar from region to region but always reflects social class.

Outerwear
 Arkhalig – a long, tight, waist-jacket made of fabrics including silk, satin, cloth, cashmere and velvet, depending on the social status of its owner.
 Gaba – male humeral outerwear, which is made from tirma, an expensive shawl fabric with a woven pattern of wool or silk.
 Chukha – male humeral outerwear with layers and gathers that is detachable at the waist. It is made of cloth, tirma, and homespun textiles.
 Kurk – a collared lamb-fur coat without fastener and decorated with embroidery.

A Russian ethnographer writes about Azerbaijani male costume:

Headdresses

The  was considered a symbol of fortitude, honour and dignity of Azerbaijani men and losing it was considered as a disgrace. To steal a Papaq was considered as a hostile action against its owner and knocking down a papaq was considered a grave insult. The social dignity of the Papaq's owner could be determined by its shape. Men never took off their papaqs, even during dinner) except before salat. Appearing in public without a headdress was deemed inappropriate.

  made of lamb-fur or karakul, this was the main headwear for men. They had different forms and local names. According to E.Torchinskaya, there are four types of Azerbaijani papaqs in the State Hermitage Museum of Saint Petersburg:
  (or  – black papaq) was widespread in Karabakh and was covered with textile.
  (or  – shepherd's papaq), which was made of long-haired lamb-fur and was conical, was generally worn by the underclass.
  (or  – bey's papaq) was conical or sharp-ended. According to the name of the material from which it was made, they had a general name – Bukhara papaq, a fur that was brought from Bukhara. It was worn only by representatives of the beys' estate and the wealthy. Such papaqs were common for the elite.
  was commonly worn in Nukhinsky Uyezd. Its top was made of velvet.
 Bashlyk, which is worn around the neck, consists of a hood and long, round ends. In winter, men wear a bashlyk made of cloth and wool. Bashlyks made of camel wool are valuable in Shirvan. The lining of a Bashylk is made of colourful silk because the lining is visible when the head is turned. Generally, the bashlyk is accompanied by a yapinji.
 Arakhchin is worn under other headdresses (papaq; chalma for women). It is traditional headwear in Azerbaijan and is widespread even in the Middle Ages.
 , a type of chalma, is worn by religious leaders such as mullahs, sayyids, sheikhs and others.

Shoes
 Jorabs are woollen socks that are popular in Azerbaijan. City residents wear leather shoes with slip-ons. Boots are widespread among aristocrats.
  are everyday shoes made of leather or rawhide that are worn by villagers.

Women's wear

The national female costume of Azerbaijan consists of outerwear and underwear. Women's outerwear was made of bright and colourful textiles, the quality of which depended on the wealth of the individual or her family. The clothing also included jewellery such as golden and silver beads, buttons stylised as hordeum seeds, coins, delicate pendants and necklaces. Young women wore bright clothes with bright flowers, unlike their elders.

Outerwear
Women's outerwear consists of a shirt with wide sleeves, wide trousers to the ankle and bell-shaped shirts of the same length. Women also wore a knitted shirt with long sleeves (arkhalig, kulaja) that fitted tightly across the back and chest, and had a wide slit at the front. A tight belt was worn around the waist. A quilted, sleeveless jacket was worn in cold weather. Outerwear was often a cloak that was longer than the shirt. Women's shirts in Gazakh uyezd were long and had slits on each side.

Women of Karabakh wore a tight-fitting  to the waist and with long, hidden sleeves. Women wore tight pants with wide skirts. Long shirts that reached to the knees were worn in Nakhchivan,. Long shirts were also worn in Shusha, Shamakhi and other districts. Long  were worn only by rich women in Nakhchivan and Ganja.

Headdresses

Headdresses mostly consisted of leather in the form of a suck or caps of different forms. Over them, several headscarves were worn. Women hid their hair in a special bag called a chutga. Heads were covered with a cylindrical pillbox cap made mostly of velvet. A chalma was tied over it, along with several headscarves, named kelaghayi.

Shoes
Jorabs were common among women.

Gallery

In philately

References

 
Azerbaijan